Mahoningoceras is a genus of nautiloids included in the Nautilida that lived during the late Carboniferous.

References

 Mahoningoceras Fossilworks entry
 Jack Sepkoski 2002 List of cephalopod genera

Prehistoric nautiloid genera